The Fourteenth Man is a lost 1920 American silent comedy film starring Robert Warwick and Bebe Daniels. It was directed by Joseph Henabery and produced and distributed by Paramount Pictures.

This film is an adaption of F. Anstey's play, The Man from Blankley's. It was remade a decade later as a talkie, The Man from Blankley's, at Warner's with John Barrymore.

This film had several alternate titles ie: The Romantic Meddler, The Trouble Hunter, Hunting Trouble.

Cast
Robert Warwick as Captain Douglas Gordon
Bebe Daniels as Marjory Seaton
Walter Hiers as Harry Brooks
Robert Milasch as Jenks(*as Robert Milash)
Norman Selby as Dwight Sylvester
Jim Farley as Monk Brady
Clarence Geldart as Major McDowell
Viora Daniel as Mrs. McDowell
Robert Dudley as Tidmarsh
Lucien Littlefield as Wesley Colfax Winslow
John McKinnon as Dawes

References

External links

1920 films
American silent feature films
Lost American films
Films directed by Joseph Henabery
Paramount Pictures films
1920 comedy films
Silent American comedy films
American black-and-white films
1920 lost films
Lost comedy films
1920s American films
Films set in Scotland
American films based on plays
1920s English-language films